Nassim Ouammou (born 27 April 1993) is a French professional footballer who plays as midfielder for Maccabi Netanya.

Career
On 26 June 2019, Ouammou signed a professional contract with Rodez AF after their promotion to the Ligue 2. He made his professional debut with Rodez in a 0–0 Ligue 2 tie with LB Châteauroux on 2 August 2019.

Personal life
Born in France, Ouammou is of Moroccan descent. In 2011, he declared an interest in representing Morocco internationally.

References

External links
 
 
 
 Anciens Verts Profile

 

1993 births
Living people
Footballers from Saint-Étienne
French footballers
Rodez AF players
US Boulogne players
FC Mulhouse players
Maccabi Netanya F.C. players
Ligue 2 players
Israeli Premier League players
Championnat National players
Championnat National 2 players
Championnat National 3 players
French expatriate footballers
Expatriate footballers in Israel
French expatriate sportspeople in Israel
French sportspeople of Moroccan descent
Association football midfielders